Italy has submitted films for the Academy Award for Best International Feature Film since the conception of the award. The award is handed out annually by the United States Academy of Motion Picture Arts and Sciences to a feature-length motion picture produced outside the United States that contains primarily non-English dialogue.

The Academy Award for Best Foreign Language Film was not created until 1956; however, between 1947 and 1955, the Academy presented Honorary Awards to the best foreign language films released in the United States. These awards were not competitive, as there were no nominees but simply a winner every year that was voted on by the Board of Governors of the Academy. Three Italian films received Honorary Awards during this period. For the 1956 Academy Awards, a competitive Academy Award of Merit, known as the Best Foreign Language Film Award, was created for non-English speaking films, and has been given annually since.

, thirty-three Italian films have been nominated for Academy Award for Best Foreign Language Film, and eleven films have won the award. Among all countries that have submitted films for the award, Italy ranks first in terms of films that have won the award, followed by France (nine awards) and Spain (four awards), and second in terms of nominees, behind France (thirty-four nominations) and ahead of Spain (nineteen nominations). The only Italian directors to win multiple awards are Federico Fellini and Vittorio De Sica. Fellini received four awards for La Strada, Nights of Cabiria, 8½, and Amarcord, the most in the history of the Academy, and had three other films submitted, although none of them were accepted as nominees. De Sica received two Honorary Awards prior to the conception of the formal award for Shoeshine and The Bicycle Thief and two actual Academy Awards for Yesterday, Today and Tomorrow and The Garden of the Finzi-Continis, and had one other film, Marriage Italian-Style, accepted as a nominee.

Submissions
The Academy of Motion Picture Arts and Sciences has invited the film industries of various countries to submit their best film for the Academy Award for Best Foreign Language Film since 1956. The Foreign Language Film Award Committee oversees the process and reviews all the submitted films. Following this, they vote via secret ballot to determine the five nominees for the award. Before the award was created, the Board of Governors of the Academy voted on a film every year that was considered the best foreign language film released in the United States, and there were no submissions. Below is a list of the films that have been submitted by Italy for review by the Academy for the award since its conception.

Shortlisted Films 
Every year since 2009, Italy has announced a list of finalists that varied in number over the years (from 4 to 25 films) before announcing its official Oscar nominee. The following films have been shortlisted by the Italy's Associazione Nazionale Industrie Cinematografiche Audiovisive e Multimediali:

 2009: The Big Dream · The Double Hour · Vincere
 2010: 20 Cigarettes · Basilicata Coast to Coast · The Double Hour · I Am Love · Kiss Me Again · Loose Cannons · The Man Who Will Come · La nostra vita · Le quattro volte
 2011: Angel of Evil · Escort in Love · Heavenly Body · Notizie degli scavi · Tatanka · We Believed · We Have a Pope
 2012: Balancing Act · The Big Heart of Girls · Diaz – Don't Clean Up This Blood · Dormant Beauty · A Flat for Three · It Was the Son · Là-bas: A Criminal Education · Magnificent Presence · Reality
 2013: A Five Star Life · Long Live Freedom · Midway - Between Life and Death· Miele · The Mongrel · Salvo
 2014: Black Souls · Fasten Your Seatbelts · Quiet Bliss · Song'e Napule · Sotto una buona stella · The Wonders
 2015: Blood of My Blood · For Your Love · Latin Lover · Leopardi · Mia Madre · Sworn Virgin · The Wait · You Can't Save Yourself Alone
 2016: Indivisible · The Last Will Be the Last · Perfect Strangers · Pericle · Suburra · They Call Me Jeeg
 2017: The Ark of Disperata · Cinderella the Cat · Equilibrium · Everything You Want · A Family · Fortunata · I Have Friends in Heaven · It's the Law · Pure Hearts · The Order of Things · Sicilian Ghost Story · The Stuff Of Dreams · Tenderness
 2018: As Needed · Bloody Richard · Boys Cry · Caina · L'Esodo · Il figlio sospeso · The Girl in the Fog · Happy as Lazzaro · Imperfect Age · Just Like My Son · Like a Cat on a Highway · Little Tito and the Aliens · Manuel · Naples in Veils · Nome di donna · On My Skin · The Place · The Stolen Caravaggio · There's No Place Like Home · Where I've Never Lived
 2019: The First King: Birth of an Empire · Martin Eden · Piranhas · The Vice of Hope
 2020: 18 Presents · Alone with Her Dreams · Aspromonte: Land of the Forgotten · Bad Tales · Bar Joseph · Citizens of the World · Il delitto Mattarella · The Goddess of Fortune · Hidden Away · Into the Labyrinth · The Life Ahead · The Macaluso Sisters · Out of My League · Padrenostro · Pinocchio · The Predators · Rose Island · The Shift · The Stonebreaker · Thou Shalt Not Hate · Tornare · Trash · The Truth About La Dolce Vita · Volare
 2021: 3/19 · A Chiara · L'Arminuta · The Bad Poet · The Catholic School · Dogworld · Ennio · I fratelli De Filippo · Freaks Out · The Giants · The Inner Cage · The King of Laughter · Parsifal · Superheroes · Three Floors · We Still Talk · Yaya e Lennie: The Walking Liberty
 2022: Caravaggio's Shadow · Chiara · Dante · The Eight Mountains · Giulia · The Hummingbird · L'immensità · Lord of the Ants · Mindemic · Small Body · Strangeness

See also
 List of Academy Award winners and nominees for Best International Feature Film
 List of Academy Award–winning foreign-language films
 List of countries by number of Academy Awards for Best International Feature Film
 Cinema of Italy

Notes

References

External links
 The Official Academy Awards Database
 The Motion Picture Credits Database
 IMDb Academy Awards Page

Italy
Academy Award